The Last Summer of the Rich is a 2014 Austrian drama film directed by Peter Kern. It was screened in the Panorama section of the 65th Berlin International Film Festival.

Cast
 Amira Casar as Hanna von Stezewitz
 Nicole Gerdon as Sarah
 Winfried Glatzeder as Boris
 Margarete Tiesel
 Nicole Beutler as Katharina Lehrnickel

See also
List of lesbian, gay, bisexual or transgender-related films of 2015

References

External links
 

2014 films
2014 drama films
2014 LGBT-related films
Austrian drama films
2010s German-language films
Austrian LGBT-related films
LGBT-related drama films